Ariosoma bauchotae is an eel in the family Congridae (conger/garden eels). It was described by Christine Karrer in 1983. It is a marine, deep water-dwelling eel which is known from waters northwest of Madagascar, in the western Indian Ocean. It is known to dwell at a depth range of 308–314 metres.

Etymology
Named in honor of Marie-Louise Bauchot (b. 1928), ichthyologist and assistant manager, Muséum national d’Histoire naturelle (Paris).

References

bauchotae
Taxa named by Christine Karrer
Fish described in 1983